Dypterygia rozmani, or American bird's-wing, is a species of cutworm or dart moth in the family Noctuidae. It is found in North America.

The MONA or Hodges number for Dypterygia rozmani is 9560.

References

Further reading

External links

 

Noctuinae
Articles created by Qbugbot
Moths described in 1974